N´Dinga Mbote Amily (born 11 September 1966) is a Congolese retired footballer who played as a central midfielder.

Club career
Born in Kinshasa, Zaire, Mbote arrived at Vitória S.C. in Portugal at the age of only 20, signing from AS Vita Club. He played with the Minho side for one full decade, always competing in the Primeira Liga and sharing teams with countryman Basaula Lemba during five seasons.

N'Dinga (as he was known in Portugal), helped Vitória to five UEFA Cup qualifications, his best season being 1990–91 when he played in all 38 games – the league was then composed of 20 teams – and scored two goals, for a final ninth place.

Mbote was the centerpiece of a scandal in Portuguese football that involved his team and Académica de Coimbra: after the 1987–88 campaign, Académica was relegated following an unsuccessful protest regarding an irregular use of the player. Following a lengthy judicial battle, the two clubs ceased their relations for decades.

International career
Mbote played for the Zaire national team during one decade, his debut coming in 1988. He appeared in three matches at the 1994 Africa Cup of Nations.

References

External links

1966 births
Living people
Footballers from Kinshasa
Democratic Republic of the Congo footballers
Association football midfielders
AS Vita Club players
Primeira Liga players
Vitória S.C. players
Democratic Republic of the Congo international footballers
1988 African Cup of Nations players
1992 African Cup of Nations players
1994 African Cup of Nations players
1996 African Cup of Nations players
Democratic Republic of the Congo expatriate footballers
Expatriate footballers in Portugal
Democratic Republic of the Congo expatriate sportspeople in Portugal